Yoboki National Park is a national park in Djibouti surrounding the town of Yoboki.

The city of Yoboki was originally created as a French military post office in 1947.

References

National parks of Djibouti